Guy Manoukian (Western Armenian Կի Մանուկեան) (born in Beirut, Lebanon in 1976) is a Lebanese-Armenian musician, composer, and pianist. He is a university graduate in law in Lebanon. He was also a basketball player in the Lebanese Basketball League for Homenetmen Beirut basketball club and, after retirement, ran the club's basketball programme as a player.

Biography
Guy Manoukian played piano from the age of 4 years, after then he started studying classical music. He first appeared on television at the age of five years and was invited to play at The Lebanese Presidential Palace by the age of 6 years. Manoukian composed music at the age of 7 years and did win his first competition back then. However, he started performing professional concerts in 1994.

Guy Manoukian is married to sarah manoukian and has two sons and a daughter.(Gio, Luca and Cara)

Albums

 2001: REG project
 2003: Sarab
 2005: Live in Cairo
 2009: Assouman
 2010: Orchid
 2014: Nomad

His music also appeared in collections like "The REG Project" (2001), "Arabia Night" (2006), Bellylicious (2006), "Experience Egypt" (2006), "Ultimate Discotheque Orientale" (2007), "Fashion TV Arabia" (2007)

Manoukian Music Consultancy MMC
Guy Manoukian established Manoukian Music Consultancy , specializing in producing music and sound design for films, artists, concept albums and advertisements.

Awards
 Best Dance Album at the Armenian Music Awards in Los Angeles
 Best Arabic Tune of the Year for the music of Harem (Lebanon 2002)
 Best Dance Album at the Arabian Music Awards (Dubai 2003)

References

External links 
 Guy Manoukian Official site
 Guy Manoukian MySpace page

1976 births
Living people
Musicians from Beirut
Lebanese people of Armenian descent
Armenian musicians
Lebanese musicians
Lebanese pianists
Lebanese composers
21st-century pianists